Central America: The United States' Backyard War is a board wargame published by Victory Games a subsidiary of Avalon Hill in 1987. Designed by James McQuaid and developed by Mark Herman, it came with thick rules and 780 counters. Although interest in the topic was high, the game met with a lukewarm reception from purchasers. Nevertheless, it won the 1987 Charles S. Roberts Award for Best Modern Era Board Game.

Reviews
 Casus Belli #42 (Dec 1987)

References

External links

Board games introduced in 1987
Board wargames set in Modern history
Victory Games